Dway Ko Ko Chit (born 23 June 1993) is a Burmese footballer who plays a striker for Shan United F.C.

Honours

Club
Shan United 
Myanmar National League
Winners (2): 2017, 2019
Runners-up (1): 2018
General Aung San Shield
Champions (1): 2017
Runners-up (1): 2019

References
Dway Ko Ko Chit FB

1993 births
Living people
Burmese footballers
Myanmar international footballers
Association football forwards
Sportspeople from Mandalay
Footballers at the 2018 Asian Games
Asian Games competitors for Myanmar